Temple Aaron is a synagogue in Trinidad, Colorado. The temple is located at 407 South Maple Street. It is among the oldest synagogues in the state.

History
The congregation was founded in 1883, while the building itself was completed in 1889 by German-Jewish settlers, and underwent a restoration in 2006.

Isaac Rapp designed the building, which is an example of exotic revival style architecture. The temple is a contributing property in the Corazón de Trinidad historic district, which is listed on the National Register of Historic Places.

References

External links
 Official website

German-American culture in Colorado
German-Jewish culture in the United States
Buildings and structures in Las Animas County, Colorado
Synagogues in Colorado
Synagogues completed in 1889